Stacey Schroeder is an American film editor. Schroeder's credits include episodes of She-Hulk: Attorney at Law; Poolman, directed by Chris Pine; Cinderella and Blockers, directed by Kay Cannon; Sonic the Hedgehog, directed by Jeff Fowler; The Disaster Artist, directed by James Franco; and the pilot of Fox's The Last Man on Earth, directed by Phil Lord and Chris Miller, for which she was nominated for the Primetime Emmy Award for Outstanding Single-Camera Picture Editing for a Comedy Series in 2015.

Schroeder's film work also includes Popstar: Never Stop Never Stopping (along with editors Jamie Gross and Craig Alpert), directed by Akiva Schaffer and Jorma Taccone. Her television work also includes HBO's Eastbound & Down; FXX's You're the Worst; Netflix's Girlboss; IFC's Garfunkel & Oats; and the pilot for HBO's Max, directed by Lena Dunham.

Raised in New Port Richey, Florida, Schroeder graduated from the University of Florida with a B.A. in Film Production and Art History.

Film
Poolman (2023)
Cinderella (2021)
Sonic the Hedgehog (2020)
Blockers (2018)
 The Disaster Artist (2017)
 Popstar: Never Stop Never Stopping (2016)

Television
 She-Hulk: Attorney at Law (2022)
 Girlboss (2017)
 Max (2016)
 The Last Man on Earth (2015)
 Garfunkel & Oates (2014)
 You're the Worst (2014)
 Morgan Murphy: Irish Goodbye (2014)
 Eastbound & Down (2013)

References

External links

1979 births
Living people
American film editors
American television editors
Women television editors
University of Florida alumni